Polysayevo is a town in Kemerovo Oblast, Russia, located on the right bank of the Inya River  south of Kemerovo. Population:

History
It was founded in 1952 as a mining urban-type settlement subordinated to Leninsk-Kuznetsky. On October 30, 1989, Polysayevo was separated from Leninsk-Kusnezky and granted town status.

Administrative and municipal status
Within the framework of administrative divisions, it is, together with two rural localities, incorporated as Polysayevo Town Under Oblast Jurisdiction—an administrative unit with the status equal to that of the districts. As a municipal division, Polysayevo Town Under Oblast Jurisdiction is incorporated as Polysayevsky Urban Okrug.

References

Notes

Sources

1952 establishments in Russia
Cities and towns in Kemerovo Oblast
Populated places established in 1952